Angustura is a town in the municipality of Além Paraíba in the Zona da Mata region of Minas Gerais state, Brazil.

External links
History of Angustura 
Geody

Neighbourhoods in Minas Gerais